Transtillaspis cinifera is a species of moth of the family Tortricidae. It is found in Venezuela.

The length of the forewings is 9.5-10.5 mm. The ground colour of the forewings is brownish grey, the basal half suffused with ash grey and the apical third with dark grey. The hindwings are pale brownish cream and cream white in the basal area.

Etymology
The species name refers to the colouration of the species and is derived from cinis (meaning ash) and ferro (meaning carry).

References

Moths described in 2004
Transtillaspis
Moths of South America
Taxa named by Józef Razowski